SFX Greenherald International School is a private, elite, English-Medium school in Bangladesh. Located in Mohammadpur, Dhaka, beside St. Joseph Higher Secondary School, the school is administered by the Catholic Relegious Sisters widely known as Sisters of Our Lady of the Missions (RNDM). Even though the school is Catholic, a majority of the students are Muslims, Hindus and Buddhists.

History 
The school was established in 1912 by the RNDM Sisters, Christian Missionary. The students graduate by sitting for the  GCE O Levels and A Levels under University of Cambridge International Examinations.
The examination board, curriculum, and syllabus are set by the University of Cambridge Local Examinations Syndicate which is a department of the University of Cambridge. The exam papers are sent to the UCLES to be marked. 

The school offers extracurricular activities such as debating, science fairs, art competitions, and has athletic teams for basketball, football, and volleyball. It has an active debating club run by the students and teachers and a green world earth club.

The school admits students to its newly formed Cambridge A-Levels program.

The students participate in the National Debating Championships in the English language. The school has an annual science fair. The school also teaches French from grade 5. Subject choosing is available from 8th grade.

Notable alumni
 Irene Khan - Secretary-General of Amnesty International, working with The Daily Star.
Tanjim Ahmad (Sohel Taj)- ex MP and former State Minister, Ministry of Home Affairs, Government of Bangladesh. He is the son of the First Prime Minister of Bangladesh, Tajuddin Ahmad. 
Barrister Tanya Amir- practicing lawyer at the Supreme Court, Bangladesh.
Arif Dowla- Chairman of the ACI group

See also
 List of Jesuit sites

References

Christianity in Dhaka
Schools in Dhaka District
Cambridge schools in Bangladesh